Vivid Sydney is an annual festival of light, music and ideas, held in Sydney, Australia. It includes outdoor immersive light installations and projections, performances by local and international musicians, and an ideas exchange forum featuring public talks and debates with leading creative thinkers.

This event takes place over the course of three weeks in May and June. The centrepiece of Vivid Sydney is the light sculptures, multimedia interactive work and building projections that transform various buildings and landmarks such as the Sydney Opera House and Sydney Harbour Bridge in and around the Sydney central business district into an outdoor night time canvas of art.

During the 2015 festival, sites of interest were Central Park, Chatswood and the University of Sydney as well as around the CBD, Darling Harbour and The Rocks.

History

Vivid began as a smart light festival in 2009 for energy efficiency curated by lighting designer Mary-Anne Kyriakou and headlined by Brian Eno. Eno, in collaboration with lighting designer Bruce Ramus, projected 'light painting' onto both sides of the Opera House. The Festival was championed by Kyriakou, Anthony Bastic, Mike Day, Davina Jackson, Carolyn Grant and Barry Webb. As of May 2019, it was the biggest festival of lights, music and ideas in the world. It is owned, managed and produced by Destination NSW, the State Government's tourism and events agency. In 2019 a record 2.4 million people attended.

The 2020 event was cancelled due to the COVID-19 pandemic. In 2021 Vivid was first scheduled for 6–28 August, it was then postponed to September due to the Delta outbreak and lockdown in Sydney. It was finally cancelled on 6 August.

Commercial success 
According to then New South Wales Deputy Premier and government Andrew Stoner, Vivid Sydney 2012 attracted more than 500,000 visitors to the outdoor exhibition and events, generating around $10 million in income for the state, whereas Vivid Sydney 2013 attracted more than 800,000 visitors, contributing more than $20 million to the NSW economy.

In 2014, the festival involved the Sydney Opera House, Walsh Bay, Circular Quay, The Rocks, North Sydney, Darling Harbour, and, joining for the first time, Harbour Lights (the illumination of vessels upon the Harbour), The Star and Carriageworks.  A new projection work by London based creative team 59 Productions featured for the Lighting of the Sails of the Sydney Opera House.

In 2015, Vivid Sydney attracted more than 1.7 million visitors to the city. The 2016 Vivid event included an expanded program of multi-genre music, stimulating presentations and Vivid Talks from global presenters and dazzling light projections across the city. In 2016, a display was added at Taronga Zoo.

In 2016, Vivid Sydney was extended to 23 nights and was attended by more than 2.3 million people.

In 2017, Vivid Sydney attracted a record 2.33 million attendees and injected over $143 million into NSW's visitor economy.

In 2019, the Surry Hill precinct was included with a montage of Heckler's 50 most iconic women being displayed on the famous art deco Hollywood Hotel. Publican and proprietress Doris Goddard was inducted as the 51st icon.

Artistic program

Vivid Sydney produces programming across numerous streams.  These include Vivid Light, Vivid Music, Vivid Ideas, Vivid School, The Lighting of the Sails of Sydney Opera House and Vivid Live.

Vivid Light
Along what is known as the Vivid Light Walk, through The Rocks, Circular Quay and Royal Botanic Gardens, Sydney, there are many opportunities for individuals to interact with light installations through such means as unique technologies.
This program includes large-scale projection on other historical buildings such as the Museum of Contemporary Art Australia, Sydney's Customs House, and the historical Cadmans Cottage.
The Sydney Harbour Bridge is also illuminated.

Vivid Music
Vivid Music includes a range of contemporary music events take place throughout the Sydney CBD.  In recent years Carriageworks has played host to a Vivid Music Events.

Vivid Ideas
Vivid Ideas consists of a range of talks, fora, and workshops centred around the Creative Industries. The Vivid Ideas Exchange takes place throughout the festival at the Museum of Contemporary Art Australia.

Vivid School
Introduced in 2019, the Vivid School program targets talks, fora, and workshops centred around creativity and innovation to young people.  The program includes topics such as vocational pathways in creative industries.

Past light installations
Musical Cubes, a light installation, was an interactive activity in the harbour. In this activity, a group of six individuals would take part in a musical experiment. Each member would be given a three dimensional cube. Each cube represented a different instrument (guitar, piano, etc.) and each side of the cube would represent a different pace (measured in beats per minute). Every member of the group would take their cube, select a side, and place the cube on a table. A computer program would then interpret all the information from the cubes and play the resulting musical beat over loud speakers that surrounded the table. Participants would be allowed to change the tempo of their instrument and as they changed them, the program would react to reflect the change and play the new tune.

In 2015, Heart of the City, was another light installation located in the harbour. This was one of the more popular activities at Vivid due to its immersive nature. Heart of the City resembled a large, solid beanbag chair and was located near the Sydney Opera House. Upon reaching the front of the line, participants would be asked to seat themselves in the middle of the chair. Once seated, they would be instructed by a Vivid Sydney volunteer to insert their finger into a small hole located near the chair. If your finger was inserted correctly, the chair would begin to light up red to match your heartbeat. As participants began to notice this, their heart rate sometimes increased causing the chair to light up more rapidly.

In June 2022, a huge painting called Yarrkalpa — Hunting Ground, painted by Martumili artists in Western Australia, was projected onto the Sydney Opera House as part of the festival, accompanied by the music of electronic music duo Electric Fields and animated by creative technologists Curiious. The design symbolically depicts the area around Parnngurr, showing the seasons, cultural burning practices and Indigenous management of the land and  natural resources.

Gallery

See also
Vivid Live
Tourism in Sydney
Culture of Sydney
List of festivals in Australia

References

External links

 

Art exhibitions in Australia
Australian sculpture
Cultural conferences
Cultural festivals in Australia
Festivals established in 2009
Festivals in Sydney
Light festivals
2009 establishments in Australia